Vangelis Rides Again is a 2015 studio album by Marshmallow Coast and their 9th album total.

Track listing 
The tracks are:-

References 

2015 albums
Marshmallow Coast albums